Pottersville may refer to:

 Pottersville, Indiana
 Pottersville, New Jersey, a community
 Pottersville, New York, a hamlet in the town of Chester, Warren County, New York
 Pottersville District, Harrisville, NH, in the National Register of Historic Places listings in New Hampshire
 Pottersville Village Historic District, Pottersville, NJ, in the National Register of Historic Places listings in New Jersey
 Pottersville (Edgefield, South Carolina), in the National Register of Historic Places listings in South Carolina
 Pottersville (film)
 Pottersville, an unincorporated village in Howell County, Missouri.
 Pottersville, a fictional town in the 1946 Frank Capra film It's a Wonderful Life